Jana Tepe is a German entrepreneur, the co-founder (with Anna Kaiser) and CEO of Tandemploy, a German job sharing platform for promoting job sharing, especially for positions requiring higher qualifications.

The company, founded 2013, was taken up into the Microsoft Accelerator Program in March 2015.

Tepe has given a TEDx talk, Stop the men in grey!. In 2015, she was listed as one of BBC's 100 Women.

References

External links
 Tandemploy

1980s births
BBC 100 Women
Living people